The Maserati 8C was a Grand Prix race car built by Maserati between 1931 and 1933. The 8C was being designed by Alfieri Maserati in the early 1930s; however, he died before its completion.   
The chassis was that of the Maserati Tipo 26M, and it was initially fitted with a Tipo 26M engine with its cylinders bored out by 4 mm to arrive at its limit of 2.8 litres. Development of the new 3.0 L engine continued and it was constructed for racing in 1932. The car won the 1933 French Grand Prix and Sir Henry Birkin achieved third place driving it in the Tripoli Grand Prix.  However, it was not very successful in other races. The car featured some of the world's earliest hydraulic brakes. The Tipo 8C 3000 was the final two-seater Grand Prix Maserati, and was succeeded in 1933 by the Maserati 8CM, M for monoposto (single seat).

In 2000 an original Maserati 8C 2800 sold at an auction for US$1.65 million  and a 1932 Maserati 8C 3000 for $1.08 million.

References

8C
Grand Prix cars